Solomon Molcho ( Shelomo Molkho), or Molkho, originally Diogo Pires (c. 1500 – 13 December 1532) was a Portuguese Jewish mystic and messiah claimant. When he met with Holy Roman Emperor Charles V to urge the creation of a Jewish army, the emperor turned him over to the Inquisition and he was burned at the stake.

Early life
Nothing is known of Molcho's family or even the exact date of his birth. He was born in Portugal sometime between September 1500 and August 1502, probably to Marrano parents. His original name was Diogo Pires. He held the post of secretary to the High Court of Appeals of his native country. When the Jewish adventurer David Reubeni arrived in 1525 to negotiate with the king, ostensibly on a political mission from some of the ten lost tribes of Israel, Molcho wished to join him, but was rejected. He then circumcised himself, though without thereby gaining Reubeni's favor, and was forced to emigrate.

Mystic studies
Molcho became a master Talmudist and biblical exegesist, and then studied the Kabbalah with Joseph Taitazak. He himself inspired Joseph Caro and Shlomo Alkabetz. He then wandered as a preacher through Italy and Turkey and achieved a great reputation and suggested that the Messianic kingdom would come in 1535 or 1540. In 1529 Molcho published a portion of his sermons under the title Derashot, a book that was later renamed Sefer ha-Mefo'ar. Returning to Italy, he was opposed by prominent Jews including Jacob Mantino ben Samuel, who feared that he might cause unrest among the Jews.  He was given an audience before Pope Clement VII and gained his favor, as well as that of some Judeophile cardinals at Rome. He warned the Pope to leave Rome as the city would soon be flooded and he sent a message to the king of Portugal warning of an imminent earthquake. The occurrence of a deadly flood on October 8, 1530, and an earthquake in Lisbon on January 26, 1531, raised Molcho's reputation among the religious and political authorities.

Travels and execution
In company with David Reubeni, his mentor, he went in 1532 to Ratisbon, where the emperor Charles V was holding a diet. On this occasion, Molcho carried a flag with the Hebrew word Maccabi, the four letters מכבי which also signify an abbreviation for Exodus 15:11 "Who among the mighty is like unto God?". The three met for two hours, and while the exact content of the meeting was not recorded, letters written from the court at the time indicate Molcho proposed the establishment of a joint Jewish-Christian army to fend off the emperor's foreign enemies and, possibly, to reconquer the Holy Land. The emperor had both Molcho and Reubeni arrested and took them back to Italy. In Mantua an ecclesiastical court sentenced Molcho to death by fire. Molcho was taken to the stake in November or December 1532 (a Jewish tradition lists the date as 5th of Tevet 5293 but there are no records to confirm the date). It is claimed the emperor offered to pardon him on condition that he return to the Catholic Church, but Molcho refused, asking for a martyr's death. His mentor, David Reubeni, was exiled to Spain, where later he died.

Writings
Molcho published a book of homilies Derashot on the Bible entitled Sefer Hamefoar, based mostly on the Talmud and Midrash, in Salonika in late 1529. Two of his biographical letters, which also recount his dreams, were first published, in bowdlerized and censored form, in Amsterdam in 1660, in a book entitled Hayat Kaneh. Modern scholars have discovered several more works by Molcho, including a second book, which he had prepared for publication at the time of his death and which focused on Messianic redemption and emphasized the Kabbala, and a song, and the transcript of a synagogue lecture Molcho delivered in the spring of 1531. His second book, along with his homilies and other writings, including uncensored versions of his letters, were published as Kitvei Shlomo Molcho (The Collected Writings of Shlomo Molcho) in Jerusalem in 2019.

Molcho's writings and speeches highlighted the roles of the Messiah ben Joseph and the Messiah ben David in the process of redemption and stressed that redemption could come if Jews were faithful to God and his commandments or if the non-Jewish religious and political powers were exceedingly evil and oppressive. A dream Molcho had in 1526 apparently led him to believe he was destined to be either the Messiah ben Joseph or his precursor, but in none of his writings or speeches did he ever explicitly state this or proclaim himself the Messiah.

See also
 List of people burned as heretics
 Jewish Messiah claimants

References 

 Encyclopædia Britannica

External links

The Jewish Museum of Prague preserves a robe and a flag of Molcho.
The Kabbalist Who Wanted a Jewish Army in 1532

1500 births
1532 deaths
16th-century converts to Judaism
16th-century Portuguese people
16th-century Sephardi Jews
Conversos
Converts to Judaism from Roman Catholicism
Executed Portuguese people
Jewish martyrs
Jewish messiah claimants
Jewish mysticism
Kabbalists
People executed for apostasy
People executed by Italian states
Jewish Portuguese writers
Portuguese people executed abroad
People executed by burning
People executed by the Spanish Inquisition